Oak Hill is a mansion and plantation located in Aldie, Virginia that was for 22 years a home of Founding Father James Monroe, the fifth U.S. President. It is a National Historic Landmark, but privately owned and not open to the public.

History

The main mansion of the property was constructed in 1822 for Monroe, who subsequently split time between this estate and another home at Monroe Hill on the grounds of the University of Virginia after his term as president. Oak Hill was Monroe's only residence for three years, from 1827 to 1830, and it was one of his residences during 22 years.  The mansion was built in 1820, during Monroe's presidency.  Before that, Monroe's residence at the estate was the clapboard building known in recent years as the Monroe Cottage.

The architecture is distinctive for "its unusual pentastyle portico".  It is suggested that Thomas Jefferson, his close friend, may well have drawn plans for Oak Hill; the construction was supervised by James Hoban, designer and builder of the White House. Aside from the main house, other structures remaining from Monroe's time include the cottage, a smokehouse, springhouse, blacksmith's shop, a square barn, the stone Stallion Barn, and possibly the Brick House. The estate is a designated U.S. National Historic Landmark.

Purchase
Monroe and his uncle Joseph Jones jointly purchased 4,400 acres (18 km2) of land in Loudoun County in 1794. When Jones died without direct heirs in 1805, Monroe gained sole possession of the property. However, Monroe continued to live primarily at Highland, his residence in Albemarle County—until 1826, when he was forced to sell that property to pay debts he had incurred while serving as president.

Attempted sale
Monroe had put Oak Hill on the market in 1809, and placed an advertisement in The Washingtonian on December 23 of that year:

He also attempted to sell the land in 1825, but failed to receive an acceptable bid both times.

Retirement
In 1822, Monroe began construction on the main house, a two-story brick mansion in the Federal style. He hired James Hoban, the designer of the White House, to serve as architect.  Monroe's longtime friend and political mentor Thomas Jefferson offered many design suggestions.

Monroe and his wife, Elizabeth Kortright Monroe, retired to Oak Hill after he finished his second term as president in 1825.  In August 1825, the Marquis de Lafayette and President John Quincy Adams were guests of the Monroes there. Elizabeth Monroe died at Oak Hill on September 23, 1830. After her death, Monroe moved to New York City to live with his younger daughter and remained there until his own death on July 4, 1831.

After Monroe's death, the property passed out of the Monroe family. John W. Fairfax, later a lieutenant colonel in the Confederate States Army, bought Oak Hill in 1852. His wife remained there while Fairfax was away fighting in the American Civil War; it was visited by General George G. Meade of the Union Army on the invitation of Mrs. Fairfax about a week prior to the Battle of Gettysburg. The property passed out of the hands of John Fairfax after the war, but was later repurchased by his eldest son, Henry, a civil engineer and state senator. The estate remained in the Fairfax family until after Henry Fairfax's death in 1916. The mansion was enlarged by the addition of two wings in 1922 while owned by Frank C. Littleton and his wife, but the central facade looks much as it did during Monroe's lifetime. The property remains in private hands today and is not open to the public. It became the residence of Tom and Gayle DeLashmutt and their family following the death of the previous owner, Eugene Reed Prendergast, Mr. DeLashmutt's mother, in 1993.

Two U.S. Navy ships have been named USS Oak Hill after the estate.

See also
 List of residences of presidents of the United States
List of National Historic Landmarks in Virginia
National Register of Historic Places listings in Loudoun County, Virginia

References

Sources
Fennell, Christopher. "An Account of James Monroe's Land Holdings." June 18, 2002.

External links

Oak Hill, Loudoun County, one photo, at Virginia DHR
Oak Hill, One mile north of Gilbert's Corner on Route 15, Aldie vicinity, Loudoun, VA at the Historic American Buildings Survey (HABS)

Houses on the National Register of Historic Places in Virginia
Houses in Loudoun County, Virginia
National Historic Landmarks in Virginia
James Monroe
Monroe, Z
Federal architecture in Virginia
Houses completed in 1822
Monroe family residences
Fairfax family residences
Plantation houses in Virginia
Palladian Revival architecture in Virginia
Journey Through Hallowed Ground National Heritage Area
Historic American Buildings Survey in Virginia
National Register of Historic Places in Loudoun County, Virginia
1822 establishments in Virginia
Homes of United States Founding Fathers